Sarah Jane Morris (born 21 March 1959) is an English singer of pop, jazz, rock and R&B and a songwriter.

Biography 
In 1982, Morris joined The Republic as lead singer. A London-based Afro-Caribbean-Latin band, they received enormous publicity from the music press including cover stories with NME and City Limits and a documentary for Granada TV. But the band was deemed too political for radio play, with the exception of Capital Radio. The Republic were signed to Charlie Gillett's Oval Records Ltd and released an EP entitled Three Songs From The Republic and two singles entitled "One Chance" and "My Spies". Success did not follow and the band split up in 1984.

Morris then sang with The Happy End, a 21-piece brass band named after Bertolt Brecht, Elisabeth Hauptmann and Kurt Weill's musical play. Playing a circuit that included Brighton's Zap Club and the Edinburgh Festival Fringe, The Happy End explored protest music from Africa, Ireland and Latin America on a way that emulated Charlie Haden's Liberation Music Orchestra.

Morris explored her more theatrical side on Brecht/Eisler's There's Nothing Quite Like Money and Brecht/Weill's Pirate Jenny from The Threepenny Opera.

The Happy End released two albums on the Cooking Vinyl label with Morris. Following a successful Edinburgh run in 1986, Morris then decamped to chart success with The Communards.

Morris found fame initially with the Communards, who are best known for their hit "Don't Leave Me This Way". Morris featured prominently on many Communards tracks, her low and deep vocal range contrasting with Jimmy Somerville's falsetto. She has also recorded as a solo artist, releasing albums since 1989. These have enjoyed most popularity in Italy and Greece.

Morris also contributed to the opera The Fall of the House of Usher (1991) by Peter Hammill and Judge Smith, singing the part of the chorus. She also sang the part of Mère Ubu on the Pere Ubu album Long Live Père Ubu! (2009), which features songs from Bring Me The Head of Pere Ubu, David Thomas's theatrical adaptation of Alfred Jarry's Ubu Roi.

She recorded an album of John Martyn covers with guitarist Tony Rémy in 2019 entitled Sweet Little Mystery and is touring with him playing the songs from the album. 

She is a cousin of American author Armistead Maupin.

Album discography
with The Happy End
There's Nothing Quite Like Money (1985)
Resolution (1987)
with The Jazz Renegades
Mother of the Future on Freedom Principle – Acid Jazz And Other Illicit Grooves Vol 2 (1989) 
solo
Sarah Jane Morris (1989)
Heaven (1992)
Blue Valentine (1995) – live at Ronnie Scott's
Fallen Angel (1998)
I Am A Woman (2000) – compilation
August (2001)
Love And Pain (2003)
Live in Montreal (2004) – live at the Montreal Jazz Festival
After All These Years (2006) – compilation
Angels at Christmas (2007) – 7-track EP
Migratory Birds (2008)
Where It Hurts (2009)
Cello Songs (2011)
Bloody Rain (2014)
Compared to What (2016, with Antonio Forcione)
Sweet Little Mystery (2019, with Tony Rémy)
with Papik
Let the Music Play (2021)

References

External links
official website

1959 births
Living people
English contraltos
Musicians from Southampton
Sanremo Music Festival winners
English soul singers
20th-century English women singers
20th-century English singers
21st-century English women singers
21st-century English singers